Alex Wright (born 19 December 1990) is an Irish race walker. He attended Brymore Academy where he began his racewalking career.

He placed 13th at the 2010 Commonwealth Games and 31st at the 2013 World Championships.

References

External links
 
 
 
 

1990 births
Living people
Athletes from London
British male racewalkers
Irish male racewalkers
Olympic male racewalkers
Olympic athletes of Ireland
Athletes (track and field) at the 2016 Summer Olympics
Commonwealth Games competitors for England
Athletes (track and field) at the 2010 Commonwealth Games
World Athletics Championships athletes for Great Britain
World Athletics Championships athletes for Ireland
British Athletics Championships winners
People educated at Brymore School
Athletes (track and field) at the 2020 Summer Olympics